Vadlamudi is a village in Guntur district of the Indian state of Andhra Pradesh. It is the headquarters of Chebrolu mandal in Tenali revenue division. It is located in Chebrolu mandal of Tenali revenue division.

Geography 
Vadlamudi is situated to the northeast of the mandal headquarters, Chebrolu,

Governance 

Vadlamudi gram panchayat is the local self-government of the village. It is divided into wards and each ward is represented by a ward member. The village forms a part of Andhra Pradesh Capital Region and is under the jurisdiction of APCRDA.

Economy 

Sangam Dairy is the cooperative dairy for processing milk, which was formed by the Guntur district milk producers union.

Transport 

Tenali–Narakodur road passes through Vadlamudi. Rural roads connects the village with Chebrole, Penugudurupadu and Sreerangapuram. On this route, APSRTC operates buses from Guntur and Tenali bus stations.

Education 

As per the school information report for the academic year 2018–19, the village has a total of 7 schools. These schools include 3 Mandal Parishad and 4 private schools.

See also 
List of villages in Guntur district

References

External links 

Villages in Guntur district